"Selling Jesus" is a song by Skunk Anansie, released as their debut single. Although Skunk Anansie previously released "Little Baby Swastikkka" as a limited release, it was not regarded as an actual single. "Selling Jesus" is a song in protest of religion and politics, and in particular Christianity. The single is taken from their debut album, Paranoid & Sunburnt, and reached number 46 on the UK Singles Chart. Three added B-sides were included on the CD release, with track 4 'Skunk Song' being written by Ace, R. France, C. Lewis and Skin.  The title song was also included on the soundtrack to the motion picture Strange Days.

Music video 
There are two versions of the video, the first video was directed by production team Gob TV, who also directed the video for "I Can Dream", and the second video was directed by Kathryn Bigelow, for their film Strange Days.

Track listing

CD single

Notes

1995 singles
Skunk Anansie songs
Songs written by Skin (musician)
Songs written by Len Arran
1995 songs
One Little Indian Records singles
Songs critical of religion